Mendillo is a surname. Notable people with the surname include:

 Ernie Mendillo (born 1959), American musician
 Jane Mendillo, American chief executive
 Michael Mendillo, American astronomer and physicist

See also
 77136 Mendillo, a main-belt asteroid named after Michael Mendillo